Paul Roos may refer to:
 Paul Roos (Australian rules footballer) (born 1963), Australian rules football player and coach
 Paul Roos (rugby union) (1880–1948), Springbok rugby union captain
 Paul Roos Gymnasium, a high school in Stellenbosch, South Africa

See also
 Paul Ross (born 1956), English presenter, journalist and media personality
 Paul Ross (footballer) (born 1960), Australian rules footballer